PONOS Corporation is an independent video game company established in 1990 headquartered in Kyoto, Japan. The company started off as an image processing company but later on moved to game development on mobile platforms. PONOS is best known for developing and publishing the tower defense game The Battle Cats.

PONOS was also a partner of the Williams F1 team for the 2020 Formula One World Championship and the 2021 Formula One World Championship.

References 

Companies based in Kyoto
Video game companies of Japan
Video game development companies
Video game publishers
Video game companies established in 1990
Japanese companies established in 1990